Arly Aristides Velásquez Peñaloza (born August 17, 1988) is a Paralympian who represented Mexico at the 2010 Winter Paralympics, along with teammate Armando Ruiz. Velasquez broke his back in a mountain biking accident in 2001. After trying many wheelchair sports, such as shot put, wheelchair basketball and tennis, he discovered the sport of mono-skiing. Mono-skiing is similar to skiing for able-bodied however, athletes sit on a single ski with crutch-like ski poles using their hips to make turns. Velásquez also represented Mexico at the 2014, 2018 and 2022 Winter Paralympics.

Notes

References

External links

 Arly Velasquez Penaloza at the official website of the 2010 Olympic and Paralympic Winter Games
 

Paralympic alpine skiers of Mexico
Alpine skiers at the 2010 Winter Paralympics
Alpine skiers at the 2014 Winter Paralympics
Alpine skiers at the 2018 Winter Paralympics
Alpine skiers at the 2022 Winter Paralympics
Living people
Mexican male alpine skiers
1988 births